Parecis is a municipality located in the Brazilian state of Rondônia. Its population was 6,198 (2020) and its area is 2,549 km².

See also
 Parecis Plateau

References

Municipalities in Rondônia